Plateau/Gorée Arrondissement  is one of the four arrondissements of the Dakar Department in the Dakar Region of Senegal. It contains the  Fann/Point E/Amité, Gueule Tapée/Fass/Colobane, Médina, Dakar Plateau, and Gorée.

References

Arrondissements of Senegal
Dakar Region